Red Volcano is a fictional android supervillain published by DC Comics. He first appeared in DC Universe #0 (April 2008), and was created by Grant Morrison, Gail Simone and Aaron Lopresti from a concept by Greg Weisman.

Publication history
Red Volcano debuted in DC Universe #0, and returned in 2009's Red Tornado mini-series.

Fictional character biography
Red Volcano was created by Professor Ivo and T.O. Morrow. Ivo uses him as an aide during his tenure as part of the Secret Society of Super Villains. He helps Ivo in collecting soil samples from various regions of Earth where acts of genocide took place over the past 100 years. This is a plot to create a golem called Genocide. Following the Final Crisis, he was with Cheetah's Secret Society of Super Villains.

During the events of the Red Tornado miniseries, Red Volcano is one of three other androids that were created besides Red Tornado, the first of which was Red Torpedo, a female water elemental who was the first of the four, and much later Red Inferno, a fire elemental designed to look much younger than the other four. Of the four "siblings" representing the elements, Red Volcano is an earth elemental who can manipulate molten rock and magma. The Volcano lacks the humanity or conscience that his "siblings" have, going so far as to torture his creator into revealing the whereabouts of the other two robots. When Morrow tells him where the Red Inferno is, the Volcano heads for the child robot's home neighborhood and mercilessly murders the Inferno's adopted parents and destroys the entire neighborhood. He then takes the distraught Inferno with him into the atmosphere, telling him that the government was responsible for killing his parents in order to get him to destroy orbiting satellites and wreak havoc.

Powers and abilities
Red Volcano possesses heat generating abilities and wears a cape made of molten rock.

He also has super-strength and flight, and also demonstrated geokinesis to a great extent.

In other media
Red Volcano appears in Young Justice, voiced by Jeff Bennett. This version possesses geokinesis as well as pyrokinesis and lacks the molten cape. In the episode "Humanity", an android double of T. O. Morrow creates Red Volcano to destroy humanity, but the latter destroys him before setting off to make the Yellowstone Caldera erupt and cause an extinction-level event. He attempts to gain Red Tornado, Red Inferno, and Red Torpedo's help, but the trio thwart his plans, with Red Inferno and Torpedo sacrificing themselves to do so. In "Runaways", Lex Luthor secretly has Red Volcano rebuilt in order to attack and manipulate Virgil Hawkins, Tye Longshadow, Asami Koizumi, and Ed Dorado into helping the Light. While Red Volcano is destroyed by the Blue Beetle, Luthor's plot succeeds.

References

External links
 DC Comics: The Source - Like Red Tornado? Well, here’s some good news (June 11, 2009)

Comics characters introduced in 2008
Characters created by Gail Simone
DC Comics characters with superhuman strength
DC Comics robots
Robot supervillains
DC Comics supervillains
Characters created by Grant Morrison